Steven Miller (born in Wendell, Idaho) is a Republican former Idaho State Representative who represented District 26 in the A seat from 2012 until 2018. Miller is a rancher and farmer by profession.

Education
Miller earned his BS degree in agricultural engineering from the University of Idaho.

Idaho House of Representatives

Committee assignments
Agricultural Affairs Committee
Appropriations Committee
Joint Finance-Appropriations Committee
Resources and Conservation Committee

Elections

References

External links
Steven Miller at the Idaho Legislature
 

Farmers from Idaho
Ranchers from Idaho
Living people
Republican Party members of the Idaho House of Representatives
People from Camas County, Idaho
People from Wendell, Idaho
University of Idaho alumni
Year of birth missing (living people)
21st-century American politicians